Certain Affinity is an American video game development studio based in Austin, Texas. It was founded in 2006 by Max Hoberman and a small number of other ex-Bungie employees and other industry veterans.

History
Certain Affinity's creation was announced in December 2006. The studio was founded by ex-Bungie employee Max Hoberman. In addition to staff from Bungie, it also includes ex-members of companies such as Microsoft, Red Storm, Origin, Electronic Arts, Digital Anvil, NCSoft, and the now-defunct Midway Austin and Ion Storm Austin.

The studio's first work was in creating two additional multiplayer levels for the popular Xbox game Halo 2. These maps, called "Tombstone" and "Desolation" (which comprised the "Blastacular Map Pack") were the last Halo 2 maps to be released; they are remakes of levels from the original Halo, called "Hang 'Em High" and "Derelict" respectively. They were released for Halo 2 on the Xbox Live on April 17, 2007. These maps were not released for Halo 2 Vista, but were replaced with two new maps exclusive to Halo 2 Vista: "District" and "Uplift". Certain Affinity worked closely with members of Bungie and Microsoft Game Studios during the development of these two maps.

Certain Affinity started working on another project in November 2006, which was revealed to be an unannounced original IP game in the action role-playing game genre.

Certain Affinity's first original game was Age of Booty, a downloadable real-time strategy game released on Steam, Xbox Live Arcade and PlayStation Network. The title was published by Capcom on October 15, 2008.

The company helped Valve port Left 4 Dead to the Xbox 360.

In 2009, the company announced the completion of Halo Waypoint, developed in conjunction with 343 Industries.

The company worked on the "Defiant Map Pack" for Halo: Reach, released on March 15, 2011.

The company announced its new game, due to release in summer 2011, called Crimson Alliance, at RTX 2011.

Certain Affinity also partnered with 343 Industries again for the development of Halo: Combat Evolved Anniversary, which was released exclusively for Xbox 360 on November 15, 2011.

At RTX 2012, Certain Affinity announced that the studio was working with 343 Industries again on developing the Forge map-making tools for Halo 4.

At RTX 2014, Certain Affinity showed off their involvement in Halo: The Master Chief Collection with the reveal of one of the six remade Halo 2 maps, Coagulation, along with a new vehicle, the Gungoose.

In 2017, Leyou Tech invested $10 million in Certain Affinity to develop an original game.

Games

References

External links
 

Companies based in Austin, Texas
Video game companies established in 2006
Video game companies based in Texas
Video game development companies
2006 establishments in Texas